This article is about the particular significance of the century 1401–1500 to Wales and its people.

Princes of Wales
Henry of Monmouth (later King Henry V) (to 1413)
Owain Glyndŵr (unofficially, 1400–1415)
Edward of Westminster (1454–1471)
Edward of the Sanctuary (later King Edward V) (1471–1483)
Edward of Middleham (1483–1484)
Arthur Tudor (from 1489)

Princesses of Wales
Margaret Hanmer (unofficially, 1400–1415)
Anne Neville (December 1470 – 4 May 1471)

Events
1401
1 April (Good Friday) - Conwy Castle is taken by supporters of Owain Glyndŵr.
June - Battle of Mynydd Hyddgen, first major victory for Owain Glyndŵr's Welsh rebels over the English.
2 November - At the inconclusive Battle of Tuthill, Owain Glyndŵr's forces meet the English near Caernarfon.
1402
April - Owain Glyndŵr captures his arch-enemy, Reginald Grey, 3rd Baron Grey de Ruthyn.
22 June - Battle of Bryn Glas (also known as the Battle of Pilleth) on the border with England ends in victory for Glyndŵr. The Welsh capture Edmund Mortimer, son of the 3rd Earl, who defects to the Welsh cause, on 30 November marrying Owain's daughter Catrin.
August - Glamorgan joins Glyndŵr's revolt.
September - The English Parliament passes penal Laws against Wales which stop the Welsh from gathering together, obtaining office, carrying arms and living in English towns. Any Englishman who marries a Welsh woman also comes under the laws.
1403
15 May - Henry, Prince of Wales, and his men destroy Sycharth, one of the residences of Owain Glyndŵr. 
July - Owain Glyndŵr captures Carreg Cennen Castle.
21 July - Battle of Shrewsbury ends in defeat and death of Henry Percy, an ally of Owain Glyndŵr. Henry of Monmouth is seriously wounded in the battle.
Autumn (possible) - Battle of Stalling Down near Cowbridge.
1404
July - Owain Glyndŵr holds a parliament at Machynlleth.
November - The Prince of Wales and his brother Thomas of Lancaster unsuccessfully try to raise the siege of Coity Castle. 
1405
28 February - Glyndŵr Rising at its peak. Tripartite Indenture agreed between Owain Glyndŵr, the Earl of Northumberland, and Edmund Mortimer, to divide Wales and England between them.
5 May - Battle of Pwll Melyn - first major defeat for Glyndŵr.
July - A French force arrives at Milford Haven to assist the rebels. It takes the town of Haverfordwest, retakes Carmarthen and lays siege to Tenby, perhaps marching as far as Great Witley across the English border, but then retires.
August - Owain Glyndŵr holds his second parliament, at Harlech Castle.
1406
31 March - Owain Glyndŵr writes the "Pennal letter" to the King of France, outlining his policy for the future government of Wales and support for the Avignon Papacy.
1407
June - Henry, Prince of Wales, lays siege to Aberystwyth Castle.
4 October - The Pope appoints Henry Chichele Bishop of St David's.
1408
Adam of Usk returns to Wales from continental exile, seeking the patronage of Owain Glyndŵr. 
1409
Harlech Castle is captured by Henry of Monmouth.  Margaret Hanmer (Glyndŵr's wife), her children and grandchildren are taken prisoner.  As far as is known, most of them later die in captivity.
1410
Sir John Scudamore marries Alys, daughter of Owain Glyndŵr.
1411
Sir William Gamage succeeds to the Coity estates on the death of Sir Laurence Berkerolles, and lays siege to Coity Castle.
1412
June - The seneschal and the receiver of Brecon negotiate to ransom Dafydd Gam from his captivity in the hands of Owain Glyndŵr.
1415
21 September - Owain Glyndŵr goes into hiding.  His subsequent whereabouts and date of death are unknown. End of the Glyndŵr Rising.
25 October - Battle of Agincourt.  Welsh archers are key to Henry V's victory over a much larger French army.
1417
30 April - Maredudd ab Owain Glyndŵr declines the offer of a pardon from King Henry V of England.
1418
Gruffydd Young, Owain's former Chancellor, is appointed Bishop of Ross.
1419
24 April - Philip Morgan is elected Bishop of Worcester.
1420
16 October - In the new parliament, Roger Corbet and David Rathbone become MPs for the borough of Shrewsbury, while Roger's brother Robert represents Shropshire. 
4 March - Settlement made at Shrewsbury between Edward Cherleton, Lord of Powys, and Sir Gruffudd Vaughan, his brother Ieuan ap Gruffydd, and two yeomen for the capture of Sir John Oldcastle in 1417.
1421
Maredudd ab Owain Glyndŵr accepts a pardon from King Henry V of England.
1425
Iron forge at Pontypool operating by about this date.
1426
William ap Thomas, ancestor of the Herbert Earls of Pembroke, is knighted.
1435
Work begins on the construction of Raglan Castle (approximate).
1437
January - Owen Tudor is imprisoned at Newgate Prison following the death of his wife, Catherine of Valois.
1450
April - William Herbert, 1st Earl of Pembroke, is taken prisoner at the Battle of Formigny.
Eisteddfod at Carmarthen: Dafydd ab Edmwnd wins the silver chair for his poetry.
1452
7 July - Eleanor, Duchess of Gloucester, exiled after her conviction for sorcery in 1442, dies at Beaumaris Castle.
23 November - King Henry VI of England acknowledges his half-brothers, Edmund and Jasper Tudor. Edmund becomes Earl of Richmond. Jasper becomes Earl of Pembroke.
1455
1 November - Edmund Tudor, 1st Earl of Richmond, marries Lady Margaret Beaufort.
1456
August - Edmund Tudor, 1st Earl of Richmond, is captured by the Yorkists and imprisoned at Carmarthen Castle, where he dies on 3 November of plague.
1457
28 January - Lady Margaret Beaufort, 13-year-old widow of Edmund Tudor, gives birth to Henry Tudor, later King Henry VII of England, at Pembroke Castle.
Sir Walter Griffith purchases Burton Agnes Hall in Yorkshire.
1460
10 July - Following defeat at the Battle of Northampton on this date, Margaret of Anjou, queen of England, escapes with her son, Edward, Prince of Wales, to Harlech Castle.
23 July - John De la Bere resigns as Bishop of St David's after supporting the Tudors in the civil war.
1461
February - After losing the Battle of Mortimer's Cross, Jasper Tudor is placed under an attainder. William Herbert, Lord Herbert of Raglan, assumes the guardianship of Margaret Beaufort and her son Henry, Earl of Richmond.
1467
Sir William Stanley is appointed steward of the lordship of Bromfield and Yale.
1468
24 June - Richard Neville, 16th Earl of Warwick, grants a charter to Neath Abbey.
14 August - The garrison of Harlech Castle surrenders to King Edward IV after a seven-year siege.
1469
27 July - Following the Battle of Edgecote Moor, William Herbert, 1st Earl of Pembroke, and his brother Richard are executed.
August - Richard Woodville, 1st Earl Rivers, and his son John Woodville are placed in prison in Chepstow.
1470
13 December - Edward of Westminster, Prince of Wales, marries (or is betrothed to) Anne Neville.
1471
4 May - Battle of Tewkesbury ends Lancastrian hopes of regaining the ascendance over the House of York.  King Edward IV of England is victorious, and Edward of Westminster becomes the only Prince of Wales ever to die in battle.  Sir John Donne is knighted on the field.
26 June - Prince Edward, son of King Edward IV, is invested as Prince of Wales.
13 October - Richard Redman is consecrated as Bishop of St Asaph.
1472
October - Following his investiture, Edward, Prince of Wales, takes up residence at Ludlow Castle, the seat of the Council of Wales and the Marches.
1473
Anthony Woodville, 2nd Earl Rivers, is appointed Governor of the Prince of Wales's Household.  John Alcock, Bishop of Rochester and the prince's tutor, becomes President of the Council of Wales and the Marches.
1478
18 February - On the death of his brother George, Duke of Clarence, Richard, Duke of Gloucester, becomes Lord of Glamorgan by right of his wife Anne Neville.
10 April - The Court of the President and Council of Wales holds its first session in Ludlow.
6 September - John Marshall is consecrated Bishop of Llandaff.
1483
14 April - At Ludlow, 12-year-old King Edward V of England receives the news of his father's sudden death and his own accession.
8 September - Edward of Middleham, son of King Richard III of England, is invested as Prince of Wales at York Minster.
25 December - At Rennes Cathedral, Henry, Earl of Richmond, pledges to marry Elizabeth of York.
1485
22 August - Battle of Bosworth Field: Henry Tudor defeats King Richard III to become the third and last Welsh-born King of England.
7 November - Jasper Tudor marries Catherine Woodville.
1486
18 January - King Henry VII marries Elizabeth of York.
2 March - Jasper Tudor becomes Lord of Glamorgan.
1488
Jasper Tudor takes possession of Cardiff Castle.
1489
29 November - The English-born Arthur Tudor is named Prince of Wales.
1490
27 February - Arthur Tudor is ceremonially invested as Prince of Wales at the Palace of Westminster.
1495
16 February - Sir William Stanley is executed for treason in London; Henry VII of England seizes Holt Castle from him.
1496
A public convenience is built on the "Old Welsh Bridge" in Shrewsbury.
1498
An insurrection breaks out in Meirionnydd in north Wales; the rebels capture Harlech Castle. The revolt is the last of the medieval era in Wales.

Works
1450s
Reginald Pecock - Represser of over-much weeting [blaming] of the Clergie (1455)
1460s-1480s
Peniarth 51 (c.1460)
Peniarth 109

Births
1401
27 October - Catherine of Valois, wife of King Henry V of England and later of Owen Tudor (d. 1437)
1430
11 June (possible date) - Edmund Tudor, 1st Earl of Richmond (d. 1456)
1431
unknown date - Jasper Tudor, soldier (d. 1495)
1444
14 February - Anne Beauchamp, 15th Countess of Warwick (d. 1449)
1451
5 March - William Herbert, 2nd Earl of Pembroke (d. 1491)
1453
13 October - Edward of Westminster, Prince of Wales (d. 1471)
1457
28 January - Henry Tudor, later King Henry VII of England (d. 1509)
1470
4 November - Edward "of the Sanctuary", later Prince of Wales and King Edward V of England (d. 1483?)
1478
3 February - Edward Stafford, 3rd Duke of Buckingham (executed 1521)
1485
16 December - Catherine of Aragon, later Princess of Wales (d. 1536)
1486
19 September - Arthur, Prince of Wales (d. 1502)
1491
28 June - Henry, Duke of York, later Prince of Wales and King Henry VIII of England (d. 1547)

Deaths
1402
date unknown - Hywel Sele, nobleman
1410
11 April - John Trevor, Bishop of St Asaph
1415
25 October - Dafydd Gam, soldier
1422
31 August - Henry V of England, former Prince of Wales, 34
1430
date unknown - Adam of Usk, chronicler
1435
25 October - Philip Morgan, Bishop of Ely
1437
3 January - Catherine of Valois, widow of Henry V of England and secret wife of Owen Tudor, 35
1440
30 September - Reynold Grey, 3rd Baron Grey of Ruthin, about 78
1445
date unknown - Sir William ap Thomas, builder of Raglan Castle
1446
21 October - William Lyndwood, Bishop of St David's
1456
3 November - Edmund Tudor, 1st Earl of Richmond, 26
1461
2 February - Owen Tudor, courtier, 60? (executed)
probable - Reginald Pecock, Bishop of St Asaph
1467
21 November - John Low, Bishop of St Asaph
1469
27 July - William Herbert, Earl of Pembroke, 46? (executed)
1471
May - Sir Roger Vaughan of Tretower (executed)
1483
25 June - Anthony Woodville, 2nd Earl Rivers, Governor of the Prince of Wales's Household, 43? (executed)
1484
9 April - Edward of Middleham, Prince of Wales, aged about 10
date unknown - David ap Mathew, standard bearer of King Edward IV of England, 84
1485
16 March - Anne Neville, former Princess of Wales, 28
1492
20 September - George Nevill, 4th Baron Bergavenny, about 52
1493
date unknown - Guto'r Glyn, bard and soldier, about 60
1496
January/February - John Marshall, Bishop of Llandaff
1499
c.November - John Ingleby, Bishop of Llandaff, about 65
1500
1 October - John Alcock, Tudor supporter and Lord President of the Council of Wales and the Marches

References

 
 
The Lordship of Bromfield and Yale